Suan Luang is a khwaeng (subdistrict) of Suan Luang District, in Bangkok, Thailand. In 2020, it had a total population of 48,207 people.

References

Subdistricts of Bangkok
Suan Luang district